John Koss (12 June 1895 – 27 March 1925) was a Norwegian boxer who competed in the 1920 Summer Olympics. In 1920 he was eliminated in the quarter-finals of the bantamweight class after losing his fight to the upcoming bronze medalist George McKenzie.

References

External links
 List of Norwegian boxers

1895 births
1925 deaths
Bantamweight boxers
Olympic boxers of Norway
Boxers at the 1920 Summer Olympics
Norwegian male boxers
20th-century Norwegian people